Built in 1972, Harbor Point Condominiums is a residential and commercial building in Chicago, Illinois, United States, on Lake Michigan. It was the first original condominium building in the city.

Overview

The building has views of both Grant and Millennium Parks and sits on Chicago's Monroe Harbor.

Residents of the 742 units have access to the amenities such as an indoor pool and hot tub, outdoor sun deck, work-out facility, indoor basketball and racquetball courts, a hobby room for messy projects, a lounge with free wi-fi, an indoor children's playroom, two large hospitality rooms, private outdoor garden and park, valet parking and full-time doormen and security.

The building has 22 commercial businesses, primarily located on the lower level such as a dry cleaner, grocery store, and realty agents.

See also
List of tallest buildings in Chicago

Position in Chicago's skyline

References

Residential skyscrapers in Chicago
Residential condominiums in Chicago
Residential buildings completed in 1972
Lakeshore East
1972 establishments in Illinois